Route 382, also known as Long Island Tickle Road, is a highway in the central portion of Newfoundland in the Canadian province of Newfoundland and Labrador, branching off Route 380 (Beothuck Trail) in the town of Pilley's Island. The route is the only provincial route with no communities prevalent – it is designed as an access to the Lushes Bight–Beaumont–Beaumont North (Long Island) ferry. The maximum speed limit for much of Route 382 is 60 km/h, but is reduced to 30 km/h when approaching the ferry.

Major intersections

References

382